The Patriotic Force for Change (PATRIDA; , ΠΑΤΡΙ.Δ.Α.) is a Greek political party founded in September 2022. 

Its president and founder is the member of parliament Konstantinos Bogdanos, while the vice president is the jurist Afroditi Latinopoulou. The slogan of the party is "Homeland, Religion, Family and Economic Freedom."  

The party is represented in the Hellenic Parliament by Konstantinos Bogdanos, an independent member of parliament from Athens, where he was elected in 2019 with New Democracy. The party is seeking membership in the European Conservatives and Reformists group of the EU parliament.

In January 2023, the electoral cooperation with K.Y.M.A of Hellenism was announced.

In March 2023, the joint descent into the elections with the party of Prodromos Emfietzoglou "Patriotic Union" and the already cooperating parties "Patriotic Association", "ELKIS", the "United Greece-New Europe" party and the "National Patriotic Party of Greece" was announced in which Bogdanos assumes the role of vice-president.
The "Hellenism Committee", the Hellenic Section of the U.S Republican Party and the Hellenic-Russian-Armenian Friendship Association have expressed their support for this cooperation. Afroditi Latinopoulou was deleted after her refusal to participate in this union. Later, K.Y.M.A of Hellenism announced the end of the cooperation with PATRIDA.

Ideology 
The Patriotic Force for Change, according to its constitution, is defined as a right-wing, conservative, bourgeois and economically liberal party. Some media characterize it as far-right, a characterization that its president, Konstantinos Bogdanos, rejects, also saying that "PATRIDA is not identical with the Golden Dawn." It is considered a pro-European (despite having some Soft Euroscepticism involved in its Party agenda) and pro-Western party, although it is seeking to be part of the Eurogroup of the European Conservatives and Reformists, many of whose members are mild Eurosceptics.

References 

National conservative parties
Conservative parties in Greece
Nationalist parties in Greece
Political parties established in 2022